Gurina is a rural locality (a village) in Yogvinskoye Rural Settlement, Kudymkarsky District, Perm Krai, Russia. The population was 314 as of 2010.

Geography 
It is located 22 km north from Kudymkar.

References 

Rural localities in Kudymkarsky District